Offrande au Saint Sacrement is a meditation in A major for organ in two sections by French composer Olivier Messiaen. It is one of his earliest works for the instrument, and was posthumously published in 2001 following its discovery by Yvonne Loriod.

Background 

The Offrande was one of the works discovered by Yvonne Messiaen after the composer's death, together with his Prélude. Since the piece was not meant to be published and was discarded, there are very few details available about its origin. Organist Olivier Latry has suggested that the work may be contemporary with Le banquet céleste (1928), since the second theme from the Offrande shows some common elements. A part of this composition was rearranged for the orchestral piece Le banquet eucharistique, which was presumably written in 1928 and is now considered to be lost. The piece was published by Éditions Alphonse Leduc in 2001.

Structure 

This short piece for solo pipe organ has a total duration of 5 minutes and 34 bars. It is in the key of A major and is marked "Lent" (Slow) in the score. The piece is structured into two sections, the second one being a more developed repetition of the first one. In each section, there is an introductory subsection that is followed by a second one, which displays features of Baroque chorale preludes.

Recordings 

Since this piece was not initially intended for publication, it has been performed rarely and remains one of the lesser-known works by Messiaen. The following is a list of notable recordings of the piece:

Notes

References 

Compositions for organ
Compositions by Olivier Messiaen